The following is a list of centenarians – specifically, people who became famous as military commanders or soldiers – known for reasons other than their longevity. Living people are listed bolded and italicized. For more lists, see lists of centenarians.

References

Military commanders